Diego Hidalgo and Cristian Rodríguez were the defending champions but lost in the semifinals to Jesper de Jong and Bart Stevens.

De Jong and Stevens won the title after defeating Nicolás Barrientos and Miguel Ángel Reyes-Varela 6–4, 3–6, [10–6] in the final.

Seeds

Draw

References

External links
 Main draw

Santa Cruz Challenger II - Doubles